Cadwallon is a Welsh name derived from the Common Brittonic *Katuwellaunos (Proto-Celtic *Katu-welnā-mnos) "The One Who (-mnos) Leads (welnā-) in Battle (katu-)". The same name belonged to the Catuvellauni who lived in what is now Hertfordshire, one of the most powerful British polities in the Late Iron Age who led the resistance against the Romans in 43 CE and possibly against Caesar in 55 and 54 BCE as well.

Cadwallon is not to be confused with Caswallon, which derives from *Kađđi-welnā-mnos (the same name as Cassivellaunus), meaning "The Passionate Leader". Note that in Cornish, both Katuwellaunos(/Catuvellaunus) and Kađđiwellaunos(/Cassivellaunus) give the form Kaswallon, which adds to the confusion.

Cadwallon may refer to:
 Cadwallon Lawhir ap Einion (reigned early 6th century), King of Gwynedd
 Cadwallon ap Cadfan (reigned early 7th century), King of Gwynedd
 Cadwallon ab Owain (died ), prince of Deheubarth
 Cadwallon ab Ieuaf (died 986), King of Gwynedd
 Cadwallon ap Gruffydd (12th century), son of Gruffudd ap Cynan
 Cadwallon ap Madog (12th century), ruler of Maelienydd
 Cadwallon (role-playing game), a 2006 game published by Rackham
 Cædwalla of Wessex (c. 659 – 689), King of Wessex (Cædwalla is the Old English spelling of Cadwalla (< Brythonic *Katuwallios), an alternative form of the same name.)

See also
 Cathal